Ode to Joy is a 2016 Chinese television series jointly produced by Shandong Television Media Group and Daylight Entertainment Television Ltd. It is based on the same title novel by A Nai. The first season of the drama aired from 18 April to 10 May 2016.

The second season of the drama aired from 11 May to 10 June 2017.

Synopsis
The series is about five modern women who live on the 22nd floor of an apartment complex called "Ode to Joy" in Shanghai. Each with their unique personality and lifestyle, the five women have different backgrounds, including their age, social status, personality and careers. Their relationships were initially rocky, but eventually they became good friends and neighbours. Together, they navigate their career and love lives, solving problems and growing more resilient.

Cast

Main

Supporting

Extended

Family members

Others

Soundtrack

Season One

Season Two

Reception

Critical reception
After airing, Ode to Joy received positive reviews from critics. People's Daily considered the series as a "new style of modern drama" which caters to women. The series has also been praised for breaking away from the cookie-cutter nature of TV dramas that often feature a pure and kind-hearted Cinderella-like figure as its protagonist; and for injecting a new lease of life into the domestic TV drama industry. Hailed as China's answer to Sex and the City, the drama has been praised for its realistic story and characters which viewers were able to empathize with. Sohu commented that Ode to Joy reveals the hardships that exist underneath the surface of shiny metro life, while also exploring different social rungs. Another success factor was due to its high production quality which showcases China's modern developments.

Conversely, the series has also been criticized for encouraging the worship of wealth and leading audiences to become immersed in a world of pure illusion. The second season of the drama was also criticized for its repetitive plot, merely having a rating of 5.3 on Douban. Additionally, it was further panned for its materialist message. The series has also caused heated discussion about "virgin obsession" on social media platforms.

Commercial reception
Ode to Joy is a hit with both domestic and overseas viewers. The first season of the drama has over 18.3 billion views as of December 2016, becoming the most watched contemporary drama in China, before being surpassed by Love O2O. The total number of views on YouTube also reached over 50 million, surpassing the record previously set by Nirvana in Fire and Princess Agents.

The second season of the drama is also commercially successful, with over 1 percent viewership ratings in China and has acquired a strong international following.

Ratings

First season

Second season 

 Highest ratings are marked in red, lowest ratings are marked in blue

Awards and nominations

International broadcast

Season One

Season Two

References

External links

 Ode to Joy on YouTube
 Ode to Joy on Youku
 Ode to Joy on Sohu

2016 Chinese television series debuts
2017 Chinese television series endings
Television shows set in Shanghai
Chinese romance television series
Chinese comedy-drama television series
Zhejiang Television original programming
Dragon Television original programming
Television shows based on Chinese novels
Television series by Daylight Entertainment